was the fourth vessel to be commissioned in the 19-vessel  destroyers built for the Imperial Japanese Navy in the late 1930s under the Circle Three Supplementary Naval Expansion Program (Maru San Keikaku).

Background
The Kagerō-class destroyers were outwardly almost identical to the preceding light cruiser-sized , with improvements made by Japanese naval architects to improve stability and to take advantage of Japan's lead in torpedo technology. They were designed to accompany the Japanese main striking force and in both day and night attacks against the United States Navy as it advanced across the Pacific Ocean, according to Japanese naval strategic projections. Despite being one of the most powerful classes of destroyers in the world at the time of their completion, only one survived the Pacific War.

 Oyashio, built at the Maizuru Naval Arsenal, was laid down on 29 March 1938, launched on 29 November 1938 and commissioned on 20 August 1940.

Operational history
At the time of the attack on Pearl Harbor, Oyashio, was assigned to Destroyer Division 15 (Desdiv 15), and a member of Destroyer Squadron 2 (Desron 2) of the IJN 2nd Fleet, and had deployed from Palau, as part of the escort for the aircraft carrier  in the invasion of the southern Philippines and minelayer .

In early 1942, Oyashio participated in the invasion of the Netherlands East Indies, escorting the invasion forces for Menado, Kendari and Ambon in January, and the invasion forces for Makassar, Timor and Java in February. On 8 February, she rescued survivors from the destroyer  and on 5 March assisted  in sinking a Royal Navy minelayer. At the end of March, she returned with the aircraft carrier  from Staring-baai in Sulawesi to Sasebo.

At the end of April, Oyashio deployed from Kure to assist in the occupation of the Cagayan Islands near Palawan in early May, and then returned with the damaged aircraft carrier  from Manila to Kure on 17 May. In early June, Oyashio deployed from Saipan as part of the troopship escort for the Battle of Midway.

During the Battle of the Eastern Solomons of 24 August she was part of Admiral Kondō's Advance Force, but was not in combat. During September, Oyashio was used for patrols between Truk and Guadalcanal, and in October began operations as a "Tokyo Express" high speed troop transport to Guadalcanal. These operations continued to early-February 1943. During the Naval Battle of Guadalcanal on 13–15 November, Oyashio, launched a torpedo attack against the American battleship . After the battle, she returned with the cruiser  to Rabaul. On 21 November, she sortied from Rabaul to assist the destroyer . During the Battle of Tassafaronga on 30 November, Oyashio torpedoed the American cruiser .
 
On 9 February, Oyashio returned to Kure for repairs, together with the troopship Hakozaki Maru. At the end of April, she was at Shortland Island, and reassigned to troop transport runs.

On the night of 7–8 May 1943, while on a troop transport run to Kolombangara, Oyashio struck mines when leaving Vila (Kolombangara). While dead in the water, she was hit by an air attack, during which strafing and a direct bomb hit took 91 lives. She sank at coordinates. She was removed from the navy list on 20 June 1943.

See also 
 List of ships of the Japanese Navy

Notes

Books

External links
 CombinedFleet.com: Kagero-class destroyers
  Oyashio history

Oyashio
Oyashio
Shipwrecks in the Solomon Sea
World War II shipwrecks in the Pacific Ocean
1938 ships
Ships built by Maizuru Naval Arsenal
Maritime incidents in May 1943
Destroyers sunk by aircraft